Albert Bartha de Nagyborosnyó (12 August 1877 – 2 December 1960) was a Hungarian military officer and politician, who served as Minister of Defence twice: in 1918 and, almost thirty years later, between 1946 and 1947.

He also served in 1918 as the Minister of Defence of the short-lived Banat Republic.

Works
 Az aradi 13 vértanú pörének és kivégzésének hiteles története (1930);
 A lég- és gázvédelem kézikönyve (1938).
 Kétszer szemben a kommunizmussal

References
 Magyar Életrajzi Lexikon

1877 births
1960 deaths
Military personnel from Cluj-Napoca
People from the Kingdom of Hungary
Hungarian nobility
Royalty and nobility of Austria-Hungary
Independent Smallholders, Agrarian Workers and Civic Party politicians
Defence ministers of Hungary
Members of the National Assembly of Hungary (1945–1947)
Austro-Hungarian generals
Austro-Hungarian military personnel of World War I
Hungarian people of the Hungarian–Romanian War
Politicians from Cluj-Napoca
Hungarian emigrants to the United States